Izatullah Dawlatzai (born 10 May 1991) is an Afghan-German cricketer who has played international cricket for both Afghanistan and Germany. He is a right-handed batsman who bowls right-arm medium-fast.

Under-19 career
Dawlatzai started representing Afghanistan in age group cricket, which culminated in the Afghanistan Under-19 cricket team qualifying for the 2010 ICC Under-19 Cricket World Cup in New Zealand, for the first time in their history.  Dawlatzai represented the team in all their matches during the tournament.

Career in Afghanistan
His debut for the senior team came in a first-class match against Kenya in the 2009-10 ICC Intercontinental Cup.  In that match he took his maiden first-class wicket, that of Collins Obuya.  Following the first-class match, he made his One Day International debut against Kenya in the 2nd ODI.  In what was also his maiden List-A match, he took the wickets of Seren Waters and Collins Obuya for the cost of 37 runs.

Career in Germany
Izatullah relocated to Germany to join his fiancée, who was born in Germany but is of Afghan descent. They live in Hamburg. In 2017 Izatullah was invited to play for Marylebone Cricket Club on its tour of Germany as a special guest. He plays for KSV Cricket Club in Germany. In 2018 he met the residency qualifications for the national team and was selected in the squad for a series against Denmark in July 2018. He was also selected in the squad for 2018-19 ICC World Twenty20 Europe Qualifier and took 2/10 in the first game against Cyprus.

In May 2019, he was named in Germany's Twenty20 International (T20I) squad for their three-match series against Belgium. The matches were the first T20Is to be played by the German cricket team. He made his T20I debut for Germany against Belgium on 11 May 2019 and became the eighth cricketer to play T20 internationals for 2 countries. Later the same month, he was named in Germany's squad for the Regional Finals of the 2018–19 ICC T20 World Cup Europe Qualifier tournament in Guernsey.

References

External links
 

1991 births
Living people
Afghan cricketers
Afghanistan One Day International cricketers
Afghanistan Twenty20 International cricketers
Cricketers from Nangarhar Province
German cricketers
Germany Twenty20 International cricketers
Afghan emigrants to Germany
Dual international cricketers